An RRQR factorization or rank-revealing QR factorization is a matrix decomposition algorithm based on the QR factorization which can be used to determine the rank of a matrix. The singular value decomposition can be used to generate an RRQR, but it is not an efficient method to do so. An RRQR implementation is available in MATLAB.

References 

Matrix decompositions
Numerical linear algebra